The Trenton Moose was an American basketball team based in Trenton, New Jersey that was a member of the Eastern Basketball League and the American Basketball League.

Year-by-year

Defunct basketball teams in the United States
Basketball teams in New Jersey
Sports in Trenton, New Jersey
1932 establishments in New Jersey
1934 disestablishments in New Jersey
Basketball teams established in 1932
Sports clubs disestablished in 1934